Madhuri Vijay is an Indian author living in Hawaii. She is the author of The Far Field, which won the second JCB Prize for literature, India's most prestigious literary award.

Early life
Vijay was born and grew up in Bangalore, India. In 2009, she graduated Phi Beta Kappa from Lawrence University, where she studied psychology and English. After graduation, she received a Watson Fellowship, which took her to South Africa, Malaysia, and Tanzania while studying people from India living in foreign lands. Halfway through the fellowship, she left to attend the Iowa Writers’ Workshop.

Writing
Her debut novel on Kashmir, The Far Field, won the JCB Prize for literature, considered the highest literary award in India. In doing so, she beat out notable writers Perumal Murugan and Manoranjan Byapari. Vijay said she was surprised that the book was even published in India, where publishers were reluctant to take it on due to the "current climate in the country." She is also a recipient of the Pushcart Prize and has been longlisted for the DSC Prize for South Asian Literature. Her writing has appeared in The Best American Nonrequired Reading, Narrative Magazine and Salon, among other publications.

Personal life
As of 2019, Vijay lives in Hawaii, where she teaches English.

Awards
Watson Fellowship (2009)
Pushcart Prize (2019)
JCB Prize for Literature (2019)
Tata Literature Live First Book Award (2019)
Carnegie Medal for Excellence in Fiction (2020), long-listed
Crossword Book Award (2020)
Women AutHer Award for Best Fiction (2020)

References

External links 
 

Women writers from Karnataka
Writers from Bangalore
Indian women novelists
English-language writers from India
Living people
Lawrence University alumni
20th-century Indian novelists
21st-century Indian women writers
21st-century Indian writers
Year of birth missing (living people)
20th-century Indian women
20th-century Indian people